Ben Mahdavi is a former American football linebacker and long snapper. Over his two year career, he played for the Atlanta Falcons, Indianapolis Colts, and Amsterdam Admirals.

Early life
Mahdavi attended Mercer Island High School in Mercer Island, Washington. There, he was a member of the wrestling team, and also played running back, long snapper and linebacker on the football team. As a senior in high school, Mahdavi won the state wrestling championship.

College career
Mahdavi originally attended the University of Utah on a full football scholarship. However, after a short time, he transferred to the University of Washington. However, he did not earn a scholarship, and struggled to find a permanent roster spot for the Huskies, and work odd jobs to pay for school. He originally played long snapper for the Huskies, appearing in 10 games and lettering as a freshman in 1999. Mahdavi later received playing time at linebacker and fullback, and was a captain as a senior. Throughout his senior year, he tallied 85 total tackles, 10 sacks, and four fumble recoveries. Mahdavi also played in the East–West Shrine Game.

Education
Mahdavi received his BA in Communications and an MBA from University of Washington Michael G. Foster School of Business.

Professional career
Mahdavi was not selected in the 2003 NFL draft. However, he later signed with the Atlanta Falcons. On July 31, 2003, he suffered a broken foot, which required surgery. He was placed on injured reserve, but was subsequently released on August 6, 2003, after receiving an injury settlement. Shortly after, he was signed by the Indianapolis Colts, who ultimately sent him to NFL Europe for the 2004 season.

References

Living people
1980 births
People from Mercer Island, Washington
Players of American football from Washington (state)
Washington Huskies football players
American people of Iranian descent
Atlanta Falcons players
Indianapolis Colts players
Amsterdam Admirals players
Mercer Island High School alumni